Jean-Guy Deschamps is a former politician in Montreal, Quebec, Canada. He served on the Montreal city council from 1994 to 2001 as a member of Vision Montreal and was also an elected commissioner on the Montreal Catholic School Commission (MCSC) from 1977 to 1994.

Private life and school commissioner
Deschamps worked as an insurance broker in private life. He was elected as a commissioner for the MCSC's tenth ward in the 1977 school board elections, as a candidate of the conservative Movement scolaire confessionnel (MSC), and was re-elected in 1980, 1983, 1987, and 1990. The MSC was the dominant political force in the MCSC during this period, and Deschamps was aligned with the commission's leadership.

In June 1986, a Quebec Superior Court judge questioned the "motives and objectivity" of three school commissioners, including Deschamps, who had voted to switch construction contracts from two firms to three other companies. The judge specifically criticized what he described as "the narrowness and the chauvinism" of Deschamps's motives.

City councillor
Deschamps was first elected to Montreal city council in the 1994 municipal election for the east-end division of Tétreaultville. Vision Montreal won a majority of council seats in this election, and Deschamps served as a backbench supporter of Pierre Bourque's administration.

Deschamps held the largely ceremonial position of "pro-mayor" for a six-month term in early 1997. Beginning in January of that year, Bourque's leadership came under serious threat from dissident members of Vision Montreal; had he been forced to resign, Deschamps would have ascended to the position of mayor on a temporary basis. In the event, Bourque was able to secure his position and remained as mayor.

In February 1997, Bourque appointed Deschamps to the city's economic development committee. Later in the year, after his term as pro-mayor had ended, rumours circulated that Deschamps was considering resigning from Vision Montreal. He ultimately remained a member and was re-elected under its banner in the 1998 municipal election.

Vision Montreal won a second consecutive majority in the 1998 election, and Deschamps continued to serve as a backbench supporter of Bourque's administration. He did not seek re-election in 2001.

Electoral record

References

Living people
Montreal city councillors
Quebec school board members
Year of birth missing (living people)